Sir Henry Bockenham (c.1575 – October 1638) was an English politician.

Bockenham was the eldest son of Edmund Bokenham of Thelnetham, Suffolk and Mary Wiseman. He was educated at Emmanuel College, Cambridge, graduating in 1591. On 21 July 1601, he married Dorothy Walsingham. He was knighted on 23 October 1603, by which time he was recorded as a gentleman pensioner.

In 1604, Bockenham was elected as a Member of Parliament for Eye. He represented the seat for the duration of the parliament, until 1611. He made no recorded speeches and was appointed to only two committees. In 1612, Bockenham's father was imprisoned for debt and Bockenham himself was persuaded to spent some time overseas to avoid association with the case. By 1626, he had returned to England and the family fortunes had recovered sufficiently to be appointed a justice of the peace for Suffolk. In 1630 he was served a term as High Sheriff of Suffolk.

References

Year of birth uncertain
1638 deaths
Alumni of Emmanuel College, Cambridge
English justices of the peace
English MPs 1604–1611
High Sheriffs of Suffolk
Honourable Corps of Gentlemen at Arms
Knights Bachelor